Icrucumab (IMC-18F1) is a human monoclonal antibody designed for the treatment of solid tumors.

Icrucumab was developed by ImClone Systems Inc. It is undergoing Phase I trials.

References 

Monoclonal antibodies
Experimental cancer drugs